Reginald Lee Doss (born December 7, 1956) is a former American Football defensive end who played ten seasons in the National Football League (NFL) for the Los Angeles Rams. He is an alumnus of Hampton University.

External links
Pro-Football-Reference

American football defensive linemen
Los Angeles Rams players
Hampton Pirates football players
People from Riverside, California
1956 births
Living people
Sportspeople from Mobile, Alabama
Players of American football from Alabama
Players of American football from San Antonio